Short-track speed skating at the 2003 Winter Asian Games took place at the Misawa Ice Arena located in Misawa, Aomori Prefecture, Japan from 6 to 7 February 2003 with ten events contested — five each for men and women.

Medalists

Men

Women

Medal table

References
 Results of the Fifth Winter Asian Games

External links
 2003 AWG Medalists

 
2003 Asian Winter Games events
2003
International speed skating competitions hosted by Japan
2003 in short track speed skating